Anne Rundle (née Lamb; 1920 – 1989) was a British author of more than 40 gothic and romance novels. She also used the pseudonyms of Joanne Marshall, Marianne Lamont, Alexandra Manners, Jeanne Sanders, and Georgianna Bell. She won the Netta Muskett Award for new writers, and is one of only a few authors to have won twice the Romantic Novel of the Year Award by the Romantic Novelists' Association.

Biography

Personal life

Rundle was born in 1920 in Berwick-on-Tweed, Northumberland, the daughter of Annie Sanderson and George Manners Lamb, a soldier. She was educated at Army Schools, and attended Berwick High School for Girls.

On 1 October 1949, she married Edwin Charles Rundle. They had one daughter, Anne, and two sons, James and Iain. Anne Rundle died in 1989.

Career and works

She worked as civil servant on Newcastle upon Tyne from 1942 to 1950. When she published her first novel in 1967, she won the Netta Muskett Award for new writers. She won twice the Romantic Novel of the Year Award by the Romantic Novelists' Association for her novels Cat on a Broomstick (1970) and Flower of Silence (1971). In 1974, she was named Daughter of Mark Twain.

Published books

As Anne Rundle

Novels
 The Moon Marriage (1967)
 Sword Light (1968)
 Dragonscale (1969)
 Forest of Fear (1969)
 Tamlane (1970)
 Rakehell (1970)
 Amberwood (1972)
 Lost Lotus (1972)
 Heronbrook (1975)
 Judith Lammeter (1976)
 Grey Ghyll (1978)
 Moonbranches (1986)

As Joanne Marshall
Novels

 Cuckoo at Candlemas (1968)
 Cat on a Broomstick (1969)
 Dreaming Tower (1970)
 Flower of Silence (1970)
 Babylon Was Dust (1971)
 Wild Boar Wood (1972)
 Trellised Walk (1973)
 Sea-Song (1973)
 Follow a Shadow (1974)
 Valley of the Tall Chimneys (1975)
 Last Act (1976)
 The Peacock Bed (1978)

As Marianne Lamont

Novels
 Dark Changeling (1970)
 Green Grass Moon (1970)
 Bitter Bride-Bed (1971)
 Follow a Shadow (1974)
 Nine Moons Wasted (1976)
 Horns of the Moon (1979)
 A Serpent's Tooth (1983)

As Alexandra Manners
Novels

 The Stone Maiden (1973)
 Candles in the Wood (1974)
 The Singing Swans (1975)
 Sable Hunter (1977) aka Cardigan Square
 The White Moths (1970) aka Wildford's Daughter
 Island series
 Echoing Yesterday (1983)
 Karran Kinrade (1983)
 The Red Bird (1984)
 The Gaming House (1984)

As Jeanne Sanders

Novels
 Spindrift (1974)
 The Winds of Time (1986)

As Georgianna Bell

Novels
 Passionate Jade (1979)

References

External links

 
 Marianne Lamont, Alexandra Manners, and Joanne Marshall at LC Authorities, with 3, 6, and 2 records
 LaMont, Manners, and Marshall in WorldCat libraries

1920 births
1989 deaths
Date of birth missing
People from Berwick-upon-Tweed
Date of death missing
Place of death missing
English romantic fiction writers
RoNA Award winners
20th-century English novelists
20th-century English women writers
Women romantic fiction writers
English women novelists
Pseudonymous women writers
20th-century pseudonymous writers